"Something About Your Smile" is a single by grime vocalist Tinchy Stryder, released as the second single from his debut album, Star in the Hood on 6 August 2007. The song features guest vocals from British singer-songwriter, Cylena Cymone, and was well received by the grime scene. The song was composed by Stryder, and written by Cylena Cymone and DaVinChe, and produced by DaVinChe.

Music video

A music video was made to accompany the release of "Something About Your Smile". It was first released onto YouTube by Takeover Entertainment Ltd, on Thursday 5 July 2007, at a total length of three minutes and forty-five seconds. The music video is set in computer-generated imagery and sees Tinchy Stryder’s ability to bring an upbeat and unique pop rap angle to his original grime sound, he then proceeds with rhymes over a melodic beat, cheeky lyrics and catchy hook. Although the song vocals are of Cylena Cymone, she does not feature in the video. A female in the video lip-syncs over Cylena Cymone's vocals, then Stryder begins to dance alongside the female lip-synching the song, then a few females later appear in the video dancing. The producer of the song DaVinChe and a few members of Ruff Sqwad make a cameo in the video. The video has thus far reached over 2 million views as of Monday 17 October 2011.

Track listing

References

2007 singles
Tinchy Stryder songs
Songs with music by Tinchy Stryder
Takeover Entertainment singles
2007 songs